Mayuge Thermal Power Station is a 1.6 megawatt bagasse-fired thermal power plant in Uganda, the third-largest economy in the East African Community.

Location
The power station is located on the campus of Mayuge Sugar Industries Limited (MSIL), the owners of the station. The coordinates of the power station are 0°30'19.0"N, 33°24'56.0"E (latitude:0.505281; longitude:33.415560).

Overview
The power station is owned and operated by MSIL, one of the sugar manufacturers in Uganda. The station was designed and built around the sugar manufacturing plant of MSIL. The fibrous residue from the process of crushing sugar cane, known as bagasse, is burnt to heat water in boilers and produce steam. The steam is pressurized and used to drive turbines, which then generate electricity. The excess heat is used in the sugar manufacturing process. , the station was capable of producing a maximum of 1.6 megawatts of electricity, for internal use.

Licensure
In April 2014, the Electricity Regulatory Authority received an application for expanding the power station to a generation capacity of 21-23 megawatts. The generated power will be used internally by the factory, with the excess sold to the Uganda Electricity Transmission Company Limited and integrated into the national grid. As of July 2015, the expansion was at "Feasibility Study Stage".

See also

List of power stations in Uganda
Economy of Uganda

References

External links
All Uganda's Three Major Sugar Factories Co-generate Electricity From Bagasse
Leading Uganda’s power generation efforts - 8 February 2015

Energy infrastructure completed in 2005
Bagasse-fired power stations in Uganda
Mayuge District
Eastern Region, Uganda